Memorial High School is a public high school located in northwest San Antonio, Texas, (USA). It is one of two high schools in the Edgewood Independent School District, and is classified as a 5A school by the UIL. In 2015, the school was rated "Met Standard" by the Texas Education Agency.

Athletics
The Memorial Minutemen compete in the following sports:

Baseball
Basketball
Cheerleading
Cross Country
Football
Golf
Powerlifting
Soccer
Softball
Tennis
Track and Field
Volleyball
Marching Band

State finalists

Girls powerlifting Division 1 qualifier 2017-2018
girls powerlifting second place champion 2018-2019

References

External links
 Official website

High schools in San Antonio
Edgewood Independent School District (Bexar County, Texas) high schools